Ustad Mushtaq Hussain Khan (1878–1964) was an Indian classical vocalist. He belonged to the Rampur-Sahaswan gharana.

Early life 
Mushtaq Hussain was born in a family of traditional musicians in Sahaswan, a small town in Budaun District of Uttar Pradesh. It is where he grew up and spent his boyhood. He lisped musical notes almost before learned to speak.

Although music came to him quite early in life, he was only 10 when his father Ustad Kallan Khan held his hand and began giving him regular lessons, or rather introduced him into this art. 

Mushtaq Hussain Khan was twelve when he became a disciple of Ustad Haider Khan and went with him to Kathmandu, Nepal. He then began taking minimal music training from Haider Khan. Finally, after two years, Mushtaq Hussain came under the tutelage of Ustad Inayat Hussain Khan, the founder of Rampur-Sahaswan gharana. Collectively, he spent eighteen years of his life with his master, and these years were not spent in vain.

Musical career 
Mushtaq Hussain, at the age of thirty-five, was enlisted as one of the court musicians in Rampur. Later, he became the chief court musician of Rampur. In the twenties, when the vogue of music conferences were started in the country, Mushtaq Hussain was invited to participate in them. No music conference was considered complete without him.

Disciples 
During his long career, Mushtaq Hussain Khan trained many disciples including Bharat Ratna Pandit Bhimsen Joshi, Padma Bhushan Smt. Shanno Khurana, his son-in-law Padma Shri Ustad Ghulam Sadiq Khan, Padma Shri Smt. Naina Devi, Smt. Sulochana Brahaspati, Padma Shri Smt. Sumati Mutatkar, Ustad Afzal Hussain Khan Nizami, as well as his own sons. In this era, the people of his family have revived his tradition. The new generation of his family is making a name in classical music. Among them, ahmed hasan khan , son of Ghulam Naqi Khan, is gaining fame in tabla playing. Mushtaq Hasan Khan is also serving music outside of Hong Kong.

Awards and Achievements 

When the Government of India decided to honour outstanding exponents of the arts, he was the first vocalist to receive the Rashtrapati Award in 1952. He was also the first recipient of the Sangeet Natak Akademi award. In 1956, he retired from Rampur and joined the Shriram Bharatiya Kala Kendra, New Delhi the following year and became the first Indian classical vocalist to receive the Padma Bhushan in 1957.

Discography
 "Great Master, Great Music" (An All India Radio Recording)
 "Khayal Gunkari" (All India Radio)
 "Khayal & Tarana-Bihag" (All India Radio)
 "Rampur Sahaswan Gharana"
 "Classic Gold - Rare Gems"
 "Classic Gold"

Death 
Mushtaq Hussain's last concert was at the residence of Naina Devi (singer), where he had a cardiac arrest, and was brought to Irwin Hospital in Old Delhi, where he was declared dead on arrival. He died on 13 August 1964.His mausoleum has been built in Sahaswan, where every year his grandson, Ghulam Naqi Khan and his sons  Mushtaq Hasan kHan and  Ahmed hasan khan  spend money to celebrate the annual Urs.

See also 
 List of Padma Bhushan award recipients (1954–59)

References 
https://www.swarganga.org/artist_details.php?id=810

Hindustani singers
Indian music educators
1878 births
1964 deaths
Recipients of the Padma Bhushan in arts
20th-century Khyal singers
Recipients of the Sangeet Natak Akademi Award